The Winnipeg RCAF Bombers faced the Hamilton Flying Wildcats in the Grey Cup. Hamilton proved to be the better team, returning the coveted trophy to Steeltown for the first time since 1932.

Canadian Football News in 1943
The WIFU and the IRFU suspended operations for the duration of World War II.

Regular season

Final regular season standings
Note: GP = Games Played, W = Wins, L = Losses, T = Ties, PF = Points For, PA = Points Against, Pts = Points

Western Interprovincial Football Union
NO LEAGUE PLAY

Interprovincial Rugby Football Union
NO LEAGUE PLAY

Bold text means that they have clinched the playoffs.

Grey Cup playoffs
Note: All dates in 1943

Eastern Finals

Playoff Bracket

Grey Cup Championship
{| cellspacing="10"
| valign="top" |
{| class="wikitable"
! bgcolor="#DDDDDD" colspan="4" | November 27
31st Annual Grey Cup Game: Varsity Stadium - Toronto, Ontario
|-
|| Hamilton Flying Wildcats 23 || Winnipeg RCAF Bombers 14
|-
| align="center" colspan="4" | The Hamilton Flying Wildcats are the 1943 Grey Cup Champions
|-
|}
|}
 Note: Playoff dates are not confirmed, however since the Grey Cup dates are accurate, it is reasonable to assume the above dates are accurate.

1943 Western Canada Armed Services Rugby Football League All-StarsNOTE: During this time most players played both ways, so the All-Star selections do not distinguish between some offensive and defensive positions.QB – Lt. Lee Sherman, Winnipeg United Services
FW – Ches McCance, Winnipeg RCAF Bombers
HB – LAC Ken Charlton, Regina All Services All-Stars
HB – LAC Johnny Lake, Winnipeg RCAF Bombers
HB – Cpl. Paul Gates, Winnipeg United Services
E  – Cpl. Don Durno, Winnipeg RCAF Bombers
E  – AC2 Cliff McFayden, Winnipeg RCAF Bombers
C  – Lt. Mel Wilson, Winnipeg United Services
G – Les Lear, Winnipeg RCAF Bombers
G – Bill Ceretti, Winnipeg United Services
T – Lou Mogol, Winnipeg United Services
T – Cpl. Rube Ludwig, Winnipeg RCAF Bombers

1943 Ontario Rugby Football Union All-StarsNOTE: During this time most players played both ways, so the All-Star selections do not distinguish between some offensive and defensive positions.QB – Annis Stukus, Toronto Balmy Beach Beachers
FW – Sam Sward, Toronto Balmy Beach Beachers
HB – Joe Krol, Hamilton Flying Wildcats
HB – OS Royal Copeland, Toronto HMCS York Bulldogs
DB – Sgt. Fred Kijek, Toronto RCAF Hurricanes
E  – Jack Buckmaster, Toronto RCAF Hurricanes
E  – Jimmy Simpson, Hamilton Flying Wildcats
C  – Bob Cosgrove, Toronto RCAF Hurricanes
G – Ed Remegis, Hamilton Flying Wildcats
G – George Fraser, Ottawa Combines
T – Harry Sonshine, Toronto Balmy Beach Beachers
T – none

1943 Canadian Football Awards
 Frank Lennard Memorial Trophy - Edward Remigis as Wildcats team MVP
 Jeff Russel Memorial Trophy (IRFU MVP) – no award given due to World War II''
 Imperial Oil Trophy (ORFU MVP) - Bob Cosgrove - Toronto RCAF Hurricanes

References

 
Canadian Football League seasons
Grey Cups hosted in Toronto